Nepenthes alata (from Latin alatus "winged") is a tropical pitcher plant endemic to the Philippines. Like all pitcher plants, it is carnivorous and uses its nectar to attract insects that drown in the pitcher and are digested by the plant. It is highly polymorphic, and its taxonomy continues to be subject to revisions.

Description

N. alata can vary strongly in colouration and morphology. The floral formula is ✶ K4 A4+4+1* G0 for staminate (the apical stamen /*/ may not be present) and ✶ K4 A0 (4) for pistillate flowers.

Taxonomy
Nepenthes alata has long been treated as a highly polymorphic species spanning all the major islands of the Philippine archipelago (with the possible exception of Palawan). Nepenthes alata in this broad sense (sensu lato) is one of the easiest and most popular Nepenthes in cultivation.

In 2013, N. alata was redelimited by Martin Cheek and Matthew Jebb to encompass only those populations from northern and central Luzon with conspicuously hairy pitchers (a taxon known in horticultural circles as the "hairy N. alata"). Under this interpretation, the more southerly plants previously referred to this species actually represent the newly resurrected N. graciliflora (the "typical N. alata" of horticulture; found on Bohol, Leyte, Luzon, Mindanao, Mindoro, Panay, Samar, and Sibuyan) as well as the newly described N. negros (Biliran and Negros) and N. ramos (Mindanao). Nepenthes viridis from Dinagat and Samar is another close relative, as are N. ceciliae (Mindanao), N. copelandii (Mindanao), N. extincta (Mindanao), N. hamiguitanensis (Mindanao), N. kitanglad (Mindanao), N. kurata (Mindanao), N. leyte (Leyte), N. mindanaoensis (Dinagat and Mindanao), N. saranganiensis (Mindanao), and N. ultra (Luzon). Together these species form the so-called "N. alata group", being united by a number of morphological characters including winged petioles, lids with basal ridges on the lower surface (often elaborated into appendages), and upper pitchers that are usually broadest near the base.

Nepenthes alata is closely related to several other species, including N. copelandii, N. mindanaoensis, and N. saranganiensis. Nepenthes eustachya from Sumatra was once considered to fall within the variability of N. alata, but this was based on a misinterpretation of type specimens; these two species do not seem closely related to each other.

Infraspecific taxa

N. alata f. variegata Hort. ex P.Mann (1996) nom.nud.
N. alata var. biflora Macfarl. (1908) [=N. negros]
N. alata var. ecristata Macfarl. (1908) [=N. kurata]

Natural hybrids

N. alata × N. burkei
N. alata × N. merrilliana [=N. × merrilliata]
? (N. alata × N. merrilliana) × N. mirabilis [=N. × tsangoya]
N. alata × N. mindanaoensis
N. alata × N. mirabilis [=N. × mirabilata]
? N. alata × N. petiolata
N. alata × N. pulchra
N. alata × N. truncata [=N. × truncalata]
N. alata × N. ventricosa [=N. × ventrata]

References

Further reading

 Alejandro, G.J.D., J.P.C. Baysa, B.O.C. Lemana, G.M. Madulara, R.S. Madulid & D.A. Madulid 2007. Conspecificity of Nepenthes alata Blco. population found in Mt. Guisguis, Zambales inferred from Internal Transcribed Spacer (nrDNA) sequence data. Acta Manilana 55: 15–21. 
 Alejandro, G.J.D., R.S. Madulid & D.A. Madulid 2008. The utility of Internal Transcribed Spacer (nrDNA) sequence data for phylogenetic reconstruction in endemic Philippine Nepenthes L. (Nepenthaceae). The Philippine Scientist 45: 99–110. 
 Amoroso, V.B. & R.A. Aspiras 2011. Hamiguitan Range: a sanctuary for native flora. Saudi Journal of Biological Sciences 18(1): 7–15. 
 Amoroso, V.B., L.D. Obsioma, J.B. Arlalejo, R.A. Aspiras, D.P. Capili, J.J.A. Polizon & E.B. Sumile 2009. Inventory and conservation of endangered, endemic and economically important flora of Hamiguitan Range, southern Philippines. Blumea 54(1–3): 71–76. 
 An, C.-I., E.-I. Fukusaki & A. Kobayashi 2001. Plasma-membrane H+-ATPases are expressed in pitchers of the carnivorous plant Nepenthes alata Blanco. Planta 212(4): 547–555. 
 An, C.-I., E.-I. Fukusaki & A. Kobayashi 2002. Aspartic proteinases are expressed in pitchers of the carnivorous plant Nepenthes alata Blanco. Planta 214(5): 661–667. 
 An, C.-I., S. Takekawa, A. Okazawa, E.-I. Fukusaki & A. Kobayashi 2002. Degradation of a peptide in pitcher fluid of the carnivorous plant Nepenthes alata Blanco. Planta 215(3): 472–477. 
 Bauer, U., C.J. Clemente, T. Renner & W. Federle 2012. Form follows function: morphological diversification and alternative trapping strategies in carnivorous Nepenthes pitcher plants. Journal of Evolutionary Biology 25(1): 90–102. 
 Bauer, U. & W. Federle 2009. The insect-trapping rim of Nepenthes pitchers: surface structure and function. Plant Signaling & Behavior 4(11): 1019–1023. 
 Benz, M.J., E.V. Gorb & S.N. Gorb 2012. Diversity of the slippery zone microstructure in pitchers of nine carnivorous Nepenthes taxa. Arthropod-Plant Interactions 6(1): 147–158. 
 Beveridge, N.G.P., C. Rauch, P.J.A. Keßler, R.R. van Vugt & P.C. van Welzen 2013. A new way to identify living species of Nepenthes (Nepenthaceae): more data needed! Carnivorous Plant Newsletter 42(4): 122–128.
  Blanco, F.M. 1845. Nepenthes. In: Flora de Filipinas, segun el sistema sexual de Linneo. Segunda impresion, corregida y aumentada por el mismo autor. D. Miguel Sanchez, Manila. pp. 555–557. 
 Buch, F., M. Rott, S. Rottloff, C. Paetz, I. Hilke, M. Raessler & A. Mithöfer 2012. Secreted pitfall-trap fluid of carnivorous Nepenthes plants is unsuitable for microbial growth. Annals of Botany 111(3): 375–383. 
 Cantley, R. 2000. Nepenthes of the Philippines. [video] The 3rd Conference of the International Carnivorous Plant Society, San Francisco, USA.
 Cheek, M.R. & M.H.P. Jebb 1999. Nepenthes (Nepenthaceae) in Palawan, Philippines. Kew Bulletin 54(4): 887–895. 
 Cheers, G. 1992. Nepenthes alata. In: Letts Guide to Carnivorous Plants of the World. Letts of London House, London. p. 92.
 Clarke, C.M. 2006. Introduction. In: Danser, B.H. The Nepenthaceae of the Netherlands Indies. Natural History Publications (Borneo), Kota Kinabalu. pp. 1–15.
 Co, L. & W. Suarez 2012. Nepenthaceae. Co's Digital Flora of the Philippines.
  Eilingsfeld, A. 2008. Endoskop-Aufnahmen aus der Verdauungsflüssigkeit einer Nepenthes alata. Das Taublatt 60: 4–7.
 Fontanilla, J.R. & R. Madulid 2002. Morphometric analysis of Nepenthes alata Blco. in Mt. Guisguis, Sta. Cruz, Zambales. Acta Manilana 50: 25–31.
 Gaume, L., S. Gorb & N. Rowe 2002. Function of epidermal surfaces in the trapping efficiency of Nepenthes alata pitchers. New Phytologist 156(3): 479–489. 
 Gorb, E.V., K. Haas, A. Henrich, S. Enders, N. Barbakadze & S. Gorb 2005. Composite structure of the crystalline epicuticular wax layer of the slippery zone in the pitchers of the carnivorous plant Nepenthes alata and its effect on insect attachment. Journal of Experimental Biology 208: 4651–4662. 
 Gorb, E.V. & S.N. Gorb 2006. Physicochemical properties of functional surfaces in pitchers of the carnivorous plant Nepenthes alata Blanco (Nepenthaceae). Plant Biology (Stuttgart, Germany) 8(6): 841–848. 
 Gorb, E.V. & S.N. Gorb 2009. Chapter 8: Functional Surfaces in the Pitcher of the Carnivorous Plant Nepenthes alata: A Cryo-Sem Approach. In: S.N. Gorb (ed.) Functional Surfaces in Biology: Adhesion Related Phenomena. Volume 2. Springer. pp. 205–238.
  Gronemeyer, T. 2008. Nepenthes auf den Philippinen – ein Reisebericht. Das Taublatt 60: 15–27.
  Gronemeyer, T. & V. Heinrich 2008. Wiederentdeckung von Nepenthes surigaoensis am Naturstandort auf den Philippinen. Das Taublatt 60(1): 28–33.
 Hatano, N. & T. Hamada 2008. Proteome analysis of pitcher fluid of the carnivorous plant Nepenthes alata. Journal of Proteome Research 7(2): 809–816. 
 Hatano, N. & T. Hamada 2012. Proteomic analysis of secreted protein induced by a component of prey in pitcher fluid of the carnivorous plant Nepenthes alata. Journal of Proteomics 75(15): 4844–4852. 
 Ishisaki, K., Y. Honda, H. Taniguchi, N. Hatano & T. Hamada 2012. Heterogonous expression and characterization of a plant class IV chitinase from the pitcher of the carnivorous plant Nepenthes alata. Glycobiology 22(3): 345–351.  
 Ishisaki, K., S. Arai, T. Hamada & Y. Honda 2012. Biochemical characterization of a recombinant plant class III chitinase from the pitcher of the carnivorous plant Nepenthes alata. Carbohydrate Research 361: 170–174. 
 Kajii, E., T. Kamesaki, S. Ikemoto & Y. Miura 1988. Decomposing enzymes against human blood-group antigens in the extract of Nepenthes alata. Die Naturwissenschaften 75(5): 258–259. 
 Kajii, E., T. Kamesaki & S. Ikemoto 1991. The effect of the Nepenthes alata extract on the cold agglutinin-associated antigens. Nihon Hōigaku Zasshi 45(1): 30–32. 
 Kamesaki, T., E. Kajii & S. Ikemoto 1989. Purification of the decomposing enzyme from Nepenthes alata against glycophorin B of human red blood cells by high-performance liquid chromatography. Journal of Chromatography 489(2): 384–389. 
 Kato, M., M. Hotta, R. Tamin & T. Itino 1993. Inter- and intra-specific variation in prey assemblages and inhabitant communities in Nepenthes pitchers in Sumatra. Tropical Zoology 6(1): 11–25. Abstract 
 Kiew, R.G. 1990. Pitcher plants of Gunung Tahan. Journal of Wildlife and National Parks (Malaysia) 10: 34–37.
 Lecoufle, M. 1990. Nepenthes alata. In: Carnivorous Plants: Care and Cultivation. Blandford, London. pp. 118–121.
 Macfarlane, J.M. 1927. The Philippine species of Nepenthes. The Philippine Journal of Science 33(2): 127–140.
  Mansur, M. 2001. Koleksi Nepenthes di Herbarium Bogoriense: prospeknya sebagai tanaman hias. In: Prosiding Seminar Hari Cinta Puspa dan Satwa Nasional. Lembaga Ilmu Pengetahuan Indonesia, Bogor. pp. 244–253.
  McPherson, S. & T. Gronemeyer 2008. Die Nepenthesarten der Philippinen: eine Fotodokumentation. Das Taublatt 60: 34–78.
 Meimberg, H., P. Dittrich, G. Bringmann, J. Schlauer & G. Heubl 2000. Molecular phylogeny of Caryophyllidae s.l. based on matK sequences with special emphasis on carnivorous taxa. Plant Biology 2(2): 218–228. 
 Meimberg, H., A. Wistuba, P. Dittrich & G. Heubl 2001. Molecular phylogeny of Nepenthaceae based on cladistic analysis of plastid trnK intron sequence data. Plant Biology 3(2): 164–175. 
  Meimberg, H. 2002. Molekular-systematische Untersuchungen an den Familien Nepenthaceae und Ancistrocladaceae sowie verwandter Taxa aus der Unterklasse Caryophyllidae s. l.. Ph.D. thesis, Ludwig Maximilian University of Munich, Munich. 
 Meimberg, H. & G. Heubl 2006. Introduction of a nuclear marker for phylogenetic analysis of Nepenthaceae. Plant Biology 8(6): 831–840. 
 Merrill, E.D. 1905. Nepenthaceæ. In: A review of the identifications of the species described in Blanco's Flora de Filipinas. Bureau of Public Printing, Manila. p. 72.
 Merrill, E.D. 1918. Nepenthaceae. In: Species Blancoanae: a critical revision of the Philippine species of plants described by Blanco and by Llanos. Bureau of Printing, Manila. p. 160.
 Mey, F.S. 2013. Neotypification of Nepenthes blancoi and description of N. abalata a new species from the Philippines. Strange Fruits: A Garden's Chronicle, February 11, 2013.
 Mey, F.S. 2013. Nepenthes alzapan and an army of new species from the Philippines. Strange Fruits: A Garden's Chronicle, July 15, 2013.
 Mithöfer, A. 2011. Carnivorous pitcher plants: insights in an old topic. Phytochemistry 72(13): 1678–1682. 
 Owen, T.P. & K.A. Lennon 1999. Structure and development of the pitchers from the carnivorous plant Nepenthes alata (Nepenthaceae). American Journal of Botany 86(10): 1382–1390.
 Owen, T.P., K.A. Lennon, M.J. Santo & A.N. Anderson 1999. Pathways for nutrient transport in the pitchers of the carnivorous plant Nepenthes alata. Annals of Botany 84: 459–466. 
 Pavlovič, A., E. Masarovičová & J. Hudák 2007. Carnivorous syndrome in Asian pitcher plants of the genus Nepenthes. Annals of Botany 100(3): 527–536. 
 Renner, T. & C.D. Specht 2011. A sticky situation: assessing adaptations for plant carnivory in the Caryophyllales by means of stochastic character mapping. International Journal of Plant Sciences 172(7): 889–901. 
 Riedel, M., A. Eichner & R. Jetter 2003. Slippery surfaces of carnivorous plants: composition of epicuticular wax crystals in Nepenthes alata Blanco pitchers. Planta 218(1): 87–97. 
 Rottloff, S., R. Stieber, H. Maischak, F.G. Turini, G. Heubl & A. Mithöfer 2011. Functional characterization of a class III acid endochitinase from the traps of the carnivorous pitcher plant genus, Nepenthes. Journal of Experimental Botany 62(13): 4639–4647. 
 Santo, M.J., J.S. Massa, & T.P. Owen 1998. Glandular secretion and absorption in the carnivorous pitcher plant Nepenthes alata. American Journal of Botany 85(supplement): 92.
 Schlauer, J. 2000. Literature reviews. Carnivorous Plant Newsletter 29(2): 53.
 Scholz, I., M. Bückins, L. Dolge, T. Erlinghagen, A. Weth, F. Hischen, J. Mayer, S. Hoffmann, M. Riederer, M. Riedel & W. Baumgartner 2010. Slippery surfaces of pitcher plants: Nepenthes wax crystals minimize insect attachment via microscopic surface roughness. Journal of Experimental Biology 213: 1115–1125. 
 Slack, A. 1979. Nepenthes alata. In: Carnivorous Plants. Ebury Press, London. pp. 85–86.
 Sota, T., M. Mogi & K. Kato 1998. Local and regional-scale food web structure in Nepenthes alata pitchers. Biotropica 30(1): 82–91. 
  Syamsuardi & R. Tamin 1994. Kajian kekerabatan jenis-jenis Nepenthes di Sumatera Barat. Project report, Andalas University, Padang. Abstract  
  Syamsuardi 1995. Klasifikasi numerik kantong semar (Nepenthes) di Sumatera Barat. [Numerical classification of pitcher plants (Nepenthes) in West Sumatra.] Journal Matematika dan Pengetahuan Alam 4(1): 48–57. Abstract  
 Thornhill, A.H., I.S. Harper & N.D. Hallam 2008. The development of the digestive glands and enzymes in the pitchers of three Nepenthes species: N. alata, N. tobaica, and N. ventricosa (Nepenthaceae). International Journal of Plant Sciences 169(5): 615–624. 
 Uy, B.D. 1990. The granchina Nepenthes of the Philippines in retrospect. Carnivorous Plant Newsletter 19(1–2): 18–19.
  Wu, X., J. Li, Q. Zhong & X. Wu 2005. 猪笼草组培快繁技术. [Tissue culture and fast propagation in Nepenthes alata.] Nonwood Forest Research 23(4): 48–50.

External links

Photographs of N. alata at the Carnivorous Plant Photofinder

Carnivorous plants of Asia
alata
Endemic flora of the Philippines
Plants described in 1837
Taxa named by Francisco Manuel Blanco